Bhekizizwe Nivard Luthuli is a South African politician who is a member of the National Assembly of South Africa from the Inkatha Freedom Party. He was first elected at the 2019 South African general election.

Views 
Luthuli condemned a farm murder in July 2019.

References 

Living people
21st-century South African politicians
Members of the National Assembly of South Africa
Inkatha Freedom Party politicians
Year of birth missing (living people)